Barbara Josephine Lewalski (February 22, 1931 – March 2, 2018) was an American academic, an authority on Renaissance literature particularly known for her work on John Milton.

Early life

Born in Topeka, Kansas, to John Kiefer, a farmer, and Vivo, an elementary schoolteacher and speech therapist, she received her BSE at Emporia State University in 1950 and her AM in 1951. She went on to earn a PhD at the University of Chicago in 1956.

Career 
Her first book, Milton’s Brief Epic: The Genre, Meaning and Art of Paradise Regained, has been praised as a "trail-blazing" work that marshals "great learning in the service of understanding a specific artefact, without swamping the artefact."

Lewalski was a Guggenheim Fellow in 1967, and was elected a fellow of the American Academy of Arts and Sciences in 1980 and a member of the American Philosophical Society in 1986.

From 1983 to 2010 she was the William R. Kenan, Jr., Professor of English Literature and of History and Literature at Harvard University. From 1956 to 1982 she taught at Brown University, holding the positions of Alumni-Alumnae University Professor (1976–82), Director of Graduate Studies in English (1968–72), and Chair of the Renaissance Studies Program (1976–80).

In 2016, the Renaissance Society of America awarded her the Paul Oskar Kristeller Lifetime Achievement Award for recognition of her decades of scholarship.

Lewalski died in Providence, Rhode Island, at the age of 87. She had congestive heart failure and died of a heart attack on March 2, 2018.

Works
Milton's Brief Epic (1966)
Donne's "Anniversaries" and the Poetry of Praise: The Creation of a Symbolic Mode (1973)
Protestant Poetics and the Seventeenth-Century English Lyric (1979)
Paradise Lost and the Rhetoric of Literary Forms (1985)
Writing Women in Jacobean England (1993)
(editor) The Polemics and Poems of Rachel Speght (1996)
The Life of John Milton: A Critical Biography (2000)
(editor) John Milton, Paradise Lost (2007)

References

Further reading
 Amy Boesky, Mary Thomas Crane (editors) (2000), Form and Reform in Renaissance England: Essays in Honor of Barbara Kiefer Lewalski

1931 births
2018 deaths
American academics of English literature
American literary historians
Harvard University faculty
Fellows of the American Academy of Arts and Sciences
Members of the American Philosophical Society
People from Topeka, Kansas
Brown University faculty
Emporia State University alumni
University of Chicago alumni